The 1928 Grand Prix season saw the Monegasque driver Louis Chiron, and his Bugatti, take seven Grand Prix victories.

For 1928, the AIACR abandoned its 1.5-litre formula. Manufacturer interest was low, not helped by the increasing economic downturn. Instead cars would have to be between 550 and 750 kg to an open engine-formula. Originally, the World Manufacturers' Championship was planned on seven national races but as the year went on, five were cancelled and only the Indianapolis 500 and Italian Grand Prix were held. Falling under the mandatory races, the whole championship was cancelled. With the epic win for Bentley in the 1927 Le Mans and the success of the inaugural Mille Miglia road-race grabbing the public's attention, more races turned to sports- and touring-car racing.

The season is remembered primarily for a horrific accident at the Italian Grand Prix. The Talbot of Emilio Materassi swerved off the road at 200 km/h, rolled a number of times and crashed into the crowd, killing Materassi and 22 other people. The accident was the greatest single loss of life in motor-racing history to that time, and still the second worst to date, after the 1955 Le Mans disaster.

With the open formula, the Bugatti Type 35, and its variants was the dominant car. Talbot, Maserati and Alfa Romeo all had some success, but it was Bugattis that filled the entry-lists across Europe. Albert Divo won the Targa Florio for Bugatti's fourth successive year, after a spirited and well-prepared challenge from female Czech driver Eliška Junková. A month earlier, top Italian driver Pietro Bordino was killed in practice for the Alessandria Circuit. The rounds of the Italian Drivers Championship attracted many of the best drivers. A close contest developed between Chiron and Nuvolari (both Bugatti), Materassi (Talbot) and Campari (Alfa Romeo), with Campari taking the title. In the United States, the Indianapolis 500 was won by rookie Louis Meyer in a Miller. He went on to be crowned the season's AAA Champion.

Grandes Épreuves

A pink background indicates the race was run for Sports Cars or Touring Cars this year. Sources:

Major Races

Teams and drivers
These tables only intend to cover entries in the major races, as keyed above.
Sources:

Significant Privateer drivers

Note: * raced in event as a relief driver. Those in brackets show, although entered, the driver did not race
Note: † driver killed during this racing season

Regulations and Technical
With poor fields and declining interest in Grand Prix racing, the AIACR had declared at the start of the 1927 season that it would be the last for the 1.5-litre formula. Manufacturer participation was negligible, and not helped by the increasing economic downturn. Its new formula was based on weight and fuel consumption: cars had to be a minimum 500 kg to a maximum of 750 kg, while Grands Prix were stipulated to be at least 600 km long. Once again, a minimum three races had to be competed in to qualify for the championship, including the compulsory European Grand Prix, this year awarded to Great Britain. It was also declared that the European Grand Prix would be open to manufacturer-approved private entries and not just works teams. This apparently did not extend to the other races, although this is unclear.

At the end of 1927, a full seven national Grands Prix were scheduled, starting with the Indianapolis 500. Yet, as early as December 1927, the French organising body said it would not run a Grand prix and instead hold a sports-car race. The German federation announced a similar plan in February, while the British were looking at holding their race on the Isle of Man or Ireland. In March, it too was cancelled and the Italian federation was instead awarded the European GP. After the race at Indianapolis was held, both the Spanish and Belgian authorities cancelled their races, so with just the two rounds left the AIACR was forced to concede and declare the 1928 championship null and void.

However, with no formal international championship, virtually all organisers completely ignored the new regulations and chose to run to a Formula Libre, or open formula with no engine, weight, fuel or distance limitations. This lack of formal regulations opened the door to privateer drivers to bring their older vehicles back to race. This also left the Targa Florio as the blue riband event for the European racers.

The Targa Florio organisers extended the classes back out to five to cover the larger cars – up to 1.1-litre, to 1.5-litre, to 2-litre, to 3-litre and over 3-litre. As in the previous year, the 1100cc cars only ran three laps, while the rest did five laps. Two occupants were required for all cars, unless the driver carried a 70 kg ballast instead. The maximum time allowed for the five laps was 8½ hours. The Coppa Florio, in its alternate year with France, was again put up for competition and being run to the same distance as the Targa, was an additional trophy for the overall winner.

In November 1927, former race-winner and decorated war-hero Eddie Rickenbacker bought the Indianapolis Motor Speedway from Carl Fisher and Jim Allison for $700 000. Meanwhile, the AAA stuck with the 1.5-litre formula which was providing successful racing in America.

Technical Innovation

With both Delage and Talbot now out of motor-racing, the only works teams left in regular grand-prix racing were Bugatti and Maserati. The deteriorating economic situation meant companies saw racing as a luxury they could not afford, to concentrate on standard road-car manufacture to make money. This all contributed to stifle technical advancement and development, and privateer drivers instead kept racing their older cars instead of pushing companies to develop better machines.

Ettore Bugatti chose not to bring out any new variants of the eponymous Type 35 chassis. The Maserati Brothers did develop their original Tipo 26 with the 26R with a slightly larger 1.7-litre engine. The troubles at Alfa Romeo continued: Giuseppe Merosi and Giorgio Rimini resigned from the technical board at the start of the year. Then in May, Nicola Romeo was ousted from the board of directors.

On 22 April, American Ray Keech raised the Land speed record to 207.6 mph with an 81-litre monster at the Daytona Beach Road Course. Three days later, 1926 Indianapolis winner Frank Lockhart was attempting to best him at the same venue. He had already been injured in an earlier attempt in February, and broke 220 mph on his first run. However, on the return run he crashed when a tyre blew and was killed instantly. 
In March, Kurt C. Volkhart demonstrated Fritz von Opel's RAK-1, the first rocket-powered automobile. In May, Opel did speed trials with the RAK-2 on the AVUS track in Berlin.

Season review
The season opened with a second running of the Mille Miglia. Bugatti sent a strong works team of Pietro Bordino, Tazio Nuvolari and Gastone Brilli-Peri. To take them on, the Alfa Corse fielded six of their 6C sports cars, including the brand new, supercharged MMS version given to Giuseppe Campari. Although the Bugattis initially led, Campari came through to win by 8 minutes from the OM of race-organiser Franco Mazzotti. OM repeated its success of the previous year: as well as second overall, it cleaned up the first eight places in the 2-litre class.

In the first week of April, several towns of the French Riviera hosted a series of street races, culminating in the Grand Prix d'Antibes on Easter Monday. The race carried a lavish 150 000 francs in prize money and was won by Louis Chiron who had lapped the field twice. It was to presage another great street race on the Riviera – the Monaco Grand Prix.

The Circuito di Alessandria was the third round of the Italian Championship. It was to be a contest between the privateer teams of Tazio Nuvolari and Emilio Materassi. Although Nuvolari won the race after a close duel with his teammate Achille Varzi, the race was overshadowed by the death of Italian racing hero Pietro Bordino. While practicing his brand new Bugatti the weekend before, he hit a dog that ran into the road. The car then tumbled down a ravine, killing Bordino and leaving his mechanic in a coma.

With diminishing international racing, the Targa Florio took on greater significance, and hence attracted a good amount of works interest. Bugatti arrived with five cars for team regulars Ferdinando Minoia, Caberto Conelli and Louis Chiron, as well as Albert Divo (formerly of Talbot and Delage, replacing Bordino) and Gastone Brilli-Peri. Maserati also arrived with purpose. After his serious accident the year before, Alfieri Maserati stayed solely as team manager, while his brother Ernesto joined Baconin Borzacchini and Diego de Sterlich driving the 2-litre 26B, while Luigi Fagioli ran the 1.5-litre Tipo 26.

The works Alfa Romeo team, Alfa Corse, returned after a 4-year absence with two new 6C sports cars for Campari and Attilio Marinoni. Campari was given the brand new Super Sport version to race. Bugattis again dominated the field with half the entries. The 1927 winner, Emilio Materassi, was one of the dozen privateer drivers. Others included Tazio Nuvolari, René Dreyfus and the popular female Czech driver Eliška Junková. Junková had arrived a month early with her husband and, with a car and guide provided by Vincenzo Florio, set about meticulously mapping the route in what was one of the earliest examples of race-notes, by marking trees and posts with braking points and landmarks.

Chiron put in the fastest time to lead at the end of the first lap on elapsed time, with barely thirty seconds back to Campari, Divo and Junková. But when Chiron went off the road, and Divo had to pit, Junková found herself in the lead, racing right behind Divo, who had originally started two minutes earlier. Her meticulous preparation was paying off and despite Campari leading at the end of the third, a puncture dropped him back again and she led going into the fifth and final lap. From the staggered start, Campari was the first to finish. Conelli brought in his works Bugatti soon after, barely 20 seconds slower, and then Divo stormed in to take the lead by 90 seconds. Unfortunately for Junková, she suffered a puncture, losing two minutes, and then engine overheating forced her to ease off to save the car. She eventually finished fifth behind Chiron, nine minutes behind Divo who gave Bugatti their fourth consecutive victory in the Targa.

Indianapolis

The entry list for the Indianapolis 500 was once again dominated by Millers. Duesenberg had scaled back its participation, while Earl Cooper and Tommy Milton ran cars based around the Miller engines. The front-wheel drive Millers once again proved extremely fast, taking four of the top-six positions on the grid. They were led by George Stewart (who raced under the pseudonym “Leon Duray”) who established a new qualifying record. There were several major accidents in practice: Peter DePaolo rolled his Miller FD suffering mild injuries. His car would subsequently be repaired and Wilbur Shaw qualified it at the back of the grid. On a wet race-day morning L.L. Corum and Dutch Bauman both crashed their cars in warm-up and had to be scratched. This all meant that George Souders, a rookie the year before, was the only previous race-winner among the starters.

By the time of the start, the track had dried and the sun was out. Duray bolted into the lead setting a record pace for the first quarter of the race. On lap 35 Benny Shoaff hit oil entering Turn 1 and spun into the wall. He ended up facing toward the traffic but only suffered a bloody nose. Then after 62 laps, Duray's car starting overheating and he slowed, eventually retiring at two-thirds distance. Babe Stapp and Souders then swapped the lead with rookies Jimmy Gleason and Louis Meyer close behind. Gleason's greater speed got him into the lead which he held for the next 100 miles. He then pitted and was relieved by Russ Snowberger who had earlier been the first retiree. 
Going into the last quarter of the race, the race was between Tony Gulotta in the lead, Gleason (back in his car), and Louis Schneider now relieving for Lou Moore. At lap 160, light rain started falling, with the drivers put under caution for two laps until the shower moved away. The only driver caught out was Earl Devore, who slid and crashed at Turn 1 on lap 161. With twenty laps to go, Gulotta slowed and had to pit because of dropping fuel pressure. On lap 195, Gleason pitted to top up water but his mechanic missed the radiator when pouring and cracked the engine. This left Meyer to take the victory by just under a lap from the Moore/Schneider Miller with Souders four minutes back in third. Ray Keech, despite bad burns on his legs from leaking fuel, came in fourth. Meyer had driven as a relief driver for Wilbur Shaw in 1927 but was technically another rookie winner. He went on to be crowned the 1928 AAA champion.

Mid-season races
Maserati finally broke the string of nine Bugatti victories in Europe at the Coppa Etna in Sicily, when Borzacchini won for the Italian team. In fact, Maserati took three of the top four places, in front of 40000 spectators. But the triumph was marred by a bad accident, when the local Catanian driver Russo crashed into spectators. A teenager was killed and seven seriously injured, including Russo and his mechanic. Racing was also developing in North Africa and the European colonies. Both the Casablanca GP (for touring cars) and Tripoli GP were well-established now, but new races were also held this year in Algiers and Tunis. Both were won by Marcel Lehoux in his Bugatti 35C. Lehoux was a Frenchman who ran a successful automotive parts company in Algiers, and was the best of the North African drivers in the 1920s. In the southern hemisphere, the 100-Mile Road Race was held on 6.5 -mile dirt track at Phillip Island in Victoria in April. It would later be known as the first Australian Grand Prix with prize-money of £30. It was won by Arthur Waite, who had worked for Austin in England before becoming the Austin agent in Melbourne.

The Royal Rome GP was raced on a new 13 km road circuit on the southern outskirts of the city. A round of the Italian Championship, it attracted many of the top drivers. Nuvolari, Chiron, Brilli Peri, Minoia and Foresti represented Bugatti, in various guises. Maserati had six cars, including a works entry for Ernesto Maserati while Borzacchini drove as relief for Cesare Pastore with his new car. Materassi had Talbots for himself and Giuseppe Morandi, while Varzi and Aymini ran 1925 Delages. Finally, Amilcar arrived with a 3-car works team to contest the 1.1-litre voiturette class and 23 cars took the grid.
Brilli Peri took the lead from the start and he, Chiron and Nuvolari broke away from the rest. They duelled for the first half of the race with Chiron on getting into the lead on the 13th lap. After the half-time pitstops, Chiron held a 1-minute lead over Brilli-Per, with Materassi and Minoia over six minutes behind. The rest of the race was fairly pedestrian, and after 30 laps Chiron won by four minutes from Brilli Peri, then Materassi and Minoia. Luigi Fagioli was the best-finishing Maserati, in fifth.
A fortnight later, at the extremely fast Cremona track, Materassi's newest team-mate Luigi Arcangeli won an exciting victory for the Talbot team, by narrowly beating Nuvolari in a race of attrition where only four of the nineteen starters finished.

Eight days after the 24 Hours of Le Mans touring-car endurance race, Ettore Bugatti hosted his first Grand Prix Bugatti at Le Sarthe circuit. Exclusively for privateer Bugatti owners, it was run over two handicap elimination races and a 16-lap final. Prizes were three new Bugatti cars, including the first prize of a supercharged 2-litre grand-prix car (valued at FF165000). It attracted 29 drivers, including Dudley Benjafield, Louis Rigal, Louis Charavel and Goffredo Zehender who had just raced there the week beforehand. The race was won by the wealthy liqueur magnate André Dubonnet.
The formerly pre-eminent French GP was a shadow of its past. The Comminges GP was designated the national race, and run as a handicap event for sports cars. Williams won the race in a road-adapted Bugatti 35C ahead of a field of 1100cc cars.
The German GP was also a sports car race, and run on the full Nürburgring track. Won by Rudolf Caracciola and Christian Werner in their big 7-litre Mercedes-Benz SS, the race was notable for the death of Čenĕk Junek. Distraught at the death of her husband, Eliška immediately retired from racing.

The San Sebastián Grand Prix was a Bugatti-only affair, as the entry by Caracciola's Mercedes did not eventuate. Although there were only nine starters, it was a high-quality field. Divo led initially until his brakes gave out. Zehender, Lehoux and Robert Benoist then all had a turn at leading until Chiron was once again able to get to the front and claim the victory. Chiron also won the Spanish Grand Prix four days later, which was held as a series of handicap elimination heats for sports cars, before a final race.

The next two rounds of the Italian Championship were the Coppa Acerbo and Coppa Montenero. Campari easily won in his four-year old Alfa on the long straights at Pescara, while Materassi got his revenge at the twisty circuit of the lucrative Livorno race.

The European Grand Prix
The last major race of the year was the only international Grand Prix. The AIACR declared that their races were no longer exclusive to manufacturer teams. Instead, privateer drivers would be allowed to enter if they got the permission of their car's manufacturer. Without the restrictions of a set formula, the Italian Grand Prix finally drew a sizeable field. Maserati was the only company to send a works team, with two new 1.7-litre Tipo 26R for Baconin Borzacchini and Conte Aymo Maggi, and an older 2-litre 26B for Ernesto Maserati.
Bartolomeo Costantini, works team manager for Bugatti, was present to support the privateers. The strongest Bugatti drivers were Louis Chiron, Tazio Nuvolari and “Williams”. Emilio Materassi had bought the cars from the defunct Talbot works team, setting up one of the first private racing teams in Europe – the Scuderia Materassi (being the first use of the term Scuderia for a motor-racing team). His drivers with him, were Conte Gastone Brilli-Peri, Luigi Arcangeli and Gianfranco Comotti. Conte Giulio Aymini had been running a team with 2-litre Delages, but only his own car was entered for this race. Young motorcycle champion, Achille Varzi, a sometime driver for both Aymini and Nuvolari was this time entered to drive Giuseppe Campari's Alfa Romeo P2.
On a sunny day, a huge crowd gathered for the race. The start line had been moved to the back straight of the road course and 22 cars lined up on the grid, drawn by lot. At the end of the first lap, Williams had a small lead from Nuvolari and Borzacchini, then the Talbots of Materassi and Brilli-Peri. Williams had built a 20-second lead by the 5th lap when he slowed with a blown engine. Materassi had a misfiring engine and also had to pit to change two tyres, dropping down to ninth. Nuvolari took over the lead, pursued by Varzi who had moved up the field. After 100 km (10 laps), the leading group was Brilli Peri, Nuvolari, Varzi and Chiron covered by only ten seconds and changing positions regularly. Arcangeli then put in the fastest lap of the race to join the group.

It was on the 18th lap that the terrible accident happened. Materassi was fifth, a minute behind the leading pack and pushing hard to make up time. He was coming off the banking to start a new lap and travelling at 200 km/h. He had closed up behind Foresti's Bugatti to lap him when the Talbot suddenly veered off to the right, then left. It shot across the grass verge, a barbed-wire security fence and then over the 3-metre ditch into the crowd for 50 metres before tumbling back into the ditch. Materassi was thrown clear and died on impact. Twenty-two spectators were killed and another 36 injured. The senior officials immediately met and decided to keep the race running to avoid starting panic. The other four Talbots were withdrawn in respect for their team-leader.

While the rescue operation proceeded, Chiron and Varzi fought for the lead, with Nuvolari a minute behind and Borzacchini's Maserati in fourth over two minutes further back, about to be lapped. Then on lap 26 another spectacular accident occurred, happening very near the previous one. Borzacchini came off the road course at speed to go onto the banked oval. He hit a retired Bugatti parked between the two parallel tracks, tearing off the Maserati's wheel and skating along the pit-straight for 200 metres before coming to rest. Fortunately, this time it had not burst through the fence and Borzacchini got out shaken, but uninjured. By two-thirds distance, Varzi had been relieved by Campari at his regular fuel-stop. The leading two had built a two-lap lead over the rest of the field. The Bugattis of Nuvolari and Drouet scrapped for third with Maggi's Maserati (now driven by Borzacchini) five laps in arrears. The positions stayed like this for the rest of the race, with Chiron, and Bugatti, winning by two minutes from the Alfa Romeo with Nuvolari a distant fourteen minutes back in third.

This event highlighted the need for better safety measures at the Italian circuit. Examination of the cars found no evidence of them hitting each other and it was ruled that Materassi's steering manoeuvre to overtake was too strong and caused the car to lose adhesion. For the following two seasons the Italian Grand Prix was not held, while the Monza circuit underwent a complete upgrade. A subsequent official court decision in 1931 found the race organisers and Automobile Club of Italy had not taken sufficient precautions for crowd safety and were ordered to pay reparations to the families of the victims.

Louis Chiron was the dominant driver of the season, winning major races for Bugatti in France, Italy and Spain. Bugatti dominated the podiums through the year, and before his fatal accident, Materassi's Talbot team had won most of the others. Materassi himself had ended the Italian season with the highest earnings (185000 lire) ahead of Nuvolari's (178000 lire). Consistency gave Giuseppe Campari the Italian Driver's Championship. Despite the lack of technical development, the opening up of racing to privateers gave bigger grids and close racing, and had proven popular with spectators.

Results of the season's major races

italics show the driver of the race's fastest lap.
Only those drivers with a best finish of 6th or better are shown. Sources:

Citations

References
 Acerbi, Leonardo (2015) Mille Miglia – A race in pictures    Milan: Giorgio Nada Editorie  
 Cimarosti, Adriano (1997) The Complete History of Grand Prix Motor Racing    London: Aurum Press Ltd  
 Fondi, Pino (2006) Targa Florio: 20th Century Epic    Milan: Giorgio Nada Editore  
 Fox, Charles (1973) The Great Racing Cars & Drivers    London: Octopus Books Ltd  
 Georgano, Nick (1971) The Encyclopaedia of Motor Sport    London: Ebury Press Ltd  
 Higham, Peter (1995) The Guinness Guide to International Motor Racing    London: Guinness Publishing  
 Legate, Trevor (2006) 100 years of Grand Prix    Kent: Touchstone Books Ltd  
 Ludvigsen, Karl (2008) Racing Colours - Italian Racing Red    Surrey: Ian Allan Publishing Ltd  
 Monkhouse, George (1953) Grand Prix Racing Facts and Figures   London: G.T. Foulis & Co Ltd
 Montagna, Paolo (ed.) (1989) The Legendary Italian Grand Prix   Milan: A.C. Promotion
 Rendall, Ivan (1991) The Power and The Glory – A Century of Motor Racing    London: BBC Books  
 Rendall, Ivan (1993) The Chequered Flag – 100 years of Motor Racing    London: Weidenfeld & Nicolson Ltd  
 Saward, Joe (2006) The Grand Prix Saboteurs    London: Morienval Press  
 Venables, David (2009) Racing Colours - French Racing Blue    Surrey: Ian Allan Publishing Ltd

External links

  1928 Race Season – comprehensive race reports of most events, also listing entries and results. Retrieved 21 Aug 2020
  1928 World Championship – detailed article about the championship regulations. Retrieved 21 Aug 2020
  Grand Prix Winners 1895–1949 : History – Hans Etzrodt's description of the annual regulations, and changes. Retrieved 21 Apr 2020
  TeamDan  - list of the major races, entrants and results. Retrieved 21 Aug 2020
  SpeedFreaks  - list of the major races, entrants and results. Retrieved 21 Aug 2020
  6th Gear  - list of the major races and winners each year. Retrieved 21 Aug 2020
  MotorSport magazine – list of the year's races, entrants and results, by category. Retrieved 21 Aug 2020
  Grand Prix History – history of the Targa Florio race. Retrieved 21 Aug 2020
  La Targa Florio – race report and pictures of the Targa Florio. Retrieved 21 Aug 2020
  F2 Register – race results of the Targa Florio. Retrieved 21 Aug 2020
  Motorsport Memorial – motor-racing deaths by year. Retrieved 21 Aug 2020
  Racing Reference.com – list of entries and results of Indianapolis 500. Retrieved 21 Aug 2020
  ChampCar Stats – list of all the races, entrants and results of the AAA Championship. Retrieved 21 Aug 2020
  Indianapolis Motor Speedway.com – Indy 500 race results. Retrieved 21 Aug 2020

Grand Prix seasons
1928 in motorsport
 
1928 in American motorsport